Kedinje (also known as Manjarapalke) is a village in Karkala taluk of Karnataka, India.

Location

It lies between Karkala  and Padubidri. A road from Manjarapalke goes to the interior of Bola, Beladi and Kanthavara as well. There is also a road to Moodbidri.

Sport

Kambala or buffalo racing is also conducted in paddy fields. Korikatta (Cockfighting) is another favourite sport. To its supporters, cockfighting is an ancient sport in Manjarapalke held at the temples precincts in the northern parts of Kasaragod.

Education 

 Sri Vidya Bodhini Higher Primary School

References 

Villages in Udupi district